José Manuel Mota Delgado, known as Delgado (born 30 October 1957) is a former Portuguese football player.

He played 10 seasons and 128 games in the Primeira Liga for Belenenses, Portimonense, Montijo, Farense, Sporting Espinho and Benfica.

Club career
He made his Primeira Liga debut for Motijo on 2 January 1977 in a game against Belenenses.

During 5 seasons he spent to Benfica he has been a backup to Manuel Bento for the first 4 seasons, and to Silvino in his last one.

International
He has been called up to the Portugal national football team, but did not make any on-field appearances.

Honours
Benfica
Taça de Portugal: 1982-83, 1984–1985
Portuguese Champion: 1982-83, 1983–84

References

External links
 

1957 births
Living people
Footballers from Lisbon
Portuguese footballers
Portugal youth international footballers
Portugal under-21 international footballers
C.D. Montijo players
Primeira Liga players
C.F. Os Belenenses players
Portimonense S.C. players
S.L. Benfica footballers
S.C. Farense players
S.C. Espinho players
Association football goalkeepers
Portugal B international footballers